Jane Krakowski (born October 11, 1968) is an American actress, comedienne, and singer. She is best known for her starring role as Jenna Maroney in the NBC satirical comedy series 30 Rock (2006–2013, 2020), for which she received four Primetime Emmy Award nominations for Outstanding Supporting Actress in a Comedy Series. Other notable television roles have included Elaine Vassal in the Fox legal comedy-drama series Ally McBeal (1997–2002) and Jacqueline White in the Netflix comedy series Unbreakable Kimmy Schmidt (2015–2020). For the latter, she received another Primetime Emmy Award for Outstanding Supporting Actress in a Comedy Series nomination.

Krakowski made her feature film debut as Cousin Vicki Johnson in the road comedy National Lampoon's Vacation (1983), which was followed by roles in The Flintstones in Viva Rock Vegas (2000), Ice Age (2002), Alfie (2004), Open Season (2006), Pixels (2015), and The Willoughbys (2020).

Krakowski regularly performs on stage, winning the Tony Award for Best Featured Actress in a Musical for her performance in the Broadway revival of Nine (2003), as well as receiving Tony Award nominations for Grand Hotel (1989) and She Loves Me (2016). She received the Laurence Olivier Award for Best Actress in a Musical for her performance in the West End revival of Guys and Dolls (2005).

Early life
Krakowski was born and raised in Parsippany, New Jersey, the daughter of Ed Krajkowski, a chemical engineer, and Barbara (née Benoit), a college theater instructor and producing artistic director for the Women's Theater Company. She has an older brother. Her father's family is Polish, and while she speaks very little Polish, her father and grandparents are fluent.

Krakowski grew up immersed in the local theater scene as a result of her parents' activities, saying in one interview: "Instead of hiring baby sitters, they brought me along with them." She took ballet lessons at age four, but later stopped because she had the wrong body shape, instead moving more towards Broadway dancing. She attended Parsippany High School and then the Professional Children's School in New York City and Mason Gross School of the Arts at Rutgers University, New Brunswick.

Career

Television

Her first major television role was as Theresa Rebecca "T.R." Kendall in the NBC soap opera Search for Tomorrow for the NBC Daytime programming block, which she played from 1984 until the show ended on December 26, 1986. She was nominated for two consecutive Daytime Emmy Awards for her role in 1986 and 1987.

From 1997 to 2002, Krakowski played office assistant Elaine Vassal in the Fox comedy-drama series Ally McBeal; her role earned her a Golden Globe Award nomination for Best Supporting Actress in 1999.

In 2006, Krakowski was cast in the NBC comedy series 30 Rock, where she played Jenna Maroney, a cast member of the fictional late night sketch comedy show TGS with Tracy Jordan. In 2009, 2010, 2011, and 2013, she received nominations for the Primetime Emmy Award for Outstanding Supporting Actress in a Comedy Series for her role in 30 Rock.

In 2015, Krakowski was cast in the Netflix comedy series Unbreakable Kimmy Schmidt as Jacqueline White, for which she received her fifth Primetime Emmy Award nomination.

Her guest appearances include a 1981 television commercial for the video game Solar Fox; a 1996 guest appearance on Early Edition as Dr. Handleman (season one, episode three: "Baby"); 2003 appearances on Everwood as psychologist Dr. Gretchen Trott, a love interest for Treat Williams' character Dr. Andrew Brown; and on Law & Order: Special Victims Unit as Emma Spevak, a serial killer of elderly women; and a 2013 guest appearance on The Simpsons episode "The Fabulous Faker Boy" as Zhenya. She guest starred in an episode of Due South, and in multiple episodes of Modern Family.

On November 18, 2020, Fox officially announced the series reboot of the 1950s gameshow Name That Tune. Jane Krakowski as host and former American Idol judge Randy Jackson as bandleader. Premiering on January 6, 2021 (accompanying the Masked Singer spin-off The Masked Dancer on its Wednesday-night lineup), the series co-exists on Fox's programming slate with its similar series Beat Shazam. It is co-produced by Eureka, Prestige, and Fox Alternative Entertainment. Krakowski stated "one of the reasons I wanted to do Name That Tune was to perform again in front of a live audience."

She also has a supporting role in the Apple TV+ musical comedy series Schmigadoon! starring Cecily Strong.

Film

After her film debut, National Lampoon's Vacation, in 1983, Krakowski appeared in Fatal Attraction, The Flintstones in Viva Rock Vegas (where she played Betty Rubble), Marci X, Alfie, Go, Cirque du Freak: The Vampire's Assistant, Dance with Me, Stepping Out, Pretty Persuasion, Kit Kittredge: An American Girl, and Mom at Sixteen. Krakowski was originally cast in the horror film Sleepaway Camp (1983), but dropped out just before filming began because she felt her character's death scene with a curling iron was too violent. She appeared in When Zachary Beaver Came to Town as a mother who wants to become a singer. In 2004, she starred in Alan Menken's television movie version of A Christmas Carol, featured as The Ghost of Christmas Past. In 2006, she provided the voice of the deer Giselle in the animated film, Open Season.

Stage
A trained singer, Krakowski has made numerous appearances on stage. At age 18, she originated the role of Dinah the Dining Car in the 1987 Broadway production of Starlight Express. She appeared in the 1989 Broadway musical Grand Hotel as the typist and would-be film star Flaemmchen, for which she was nominated for a Tony Award. Her solo number, "I Want to Go to Hollywood", is included on the original cast recording. At the 2000 American Comedy Awards, Krakowski won rave reviews when she performed a sexually charged musical tribute and love letter to Microsoft chairman Bill Gates.

In 1995, she played the ditzy flight attendant April in the Roundabout Theater Company's revival of Company. In 1996, she starred alongside Sarah Jessica Parker in the Broadway revival of Once Upon a Mattress.

In January 2002, Windham Hill Records released an album that Jim Brickman had recorded, titled Love Songs & Lullabies; this album featured Krakowski as a vocalist for the song "You", which became a hit on adult contemporary radio stations. Brickman and Krakowski recorded an alternate Christmas version of the song. She appeared on the album Broadway Cares: Home for the Holidays, singing the song "Santa Baby". In 2003, she starred as Carla in the Broadway revival of Nine, for which she won the Tony Award for Best Featured Actress in a Musical. Krakowski is known for an anti-gravity stunt during the number "A Call from the Vatican". Krakowski and the director struggled finding a company that would let her do air stunts without a harness; Krakowski came up with the idea of using the method previously portrayed in Broadway Bares. Krakowski recalled that the material took a long time to arrive, and the second time she did it was on the first performance.

In 2005, she starred as Miss Adelaide in Michael Grandage's West End revival of Guys and Dolls at London's Piccadilly Theatre. Krakowski received the 2006 Laurence Olivier Award for Best Actress in a Musical for her performance and performed a cabaret show called Better When It's Banned, which featured various songs from the 1920s and '30s that were all deemed racy at the times of their original popularity.

Krakowski performed in a January 2007 workshop production and backers' audition for a Broadway musical adaption of the 1980 film Xanadu, with music from the film's soundtrack and a book by Douglas Carter Beane. Xanadu premiered on Broadway in Summer 2007, although Krakowski's role is played by Kerry Butler.

In 2008, Krakowski starred as Lola in New York City Center's production of Damn Yankees alongside Sean Hayes and Cheyenne Jackson.

On July 30 and 31, 2009, Krakowski performed the title character in a reading of Mrs. Sharp, whose music was composed and whose lyrics were written by Ryan Scott Oliver, and whose book was written by Kirsten A. Guenther, at Playwrights Horizons.

She performed the role of Ilona Ritter in the Roundabout Theatre Company's Broadway revival of Jerry Bock's and Sheldon Harnick's She Loves Me. The musical opened on March 17, 2016, at Studio 54. Krakowski won the 2016 Fred and Adele Astaire Award as Outstanding Female Dancer in a Broadway Show, the Outer Critics Circle Award, Outstanding Featured Actress in a Musical, and the Drama Desk Award, Outstanding Featured Actress in a Musical. She was also nominated for the Tony Award, Featured Actress in a Musical.

Other works
Krakowski played Wanda in the music video for the Dixie Chicks' song "Goodbye Earl" in 2000.

Personal life
Krakowski became engaged to Robert Godley in 2009. They have a son, Bennett Robert Godley, born in April 2011. The couple separated in 2013.

In January 2021, the Daily Mail alleged that Krakowski had a nine-month relationship with Mike Lindell, the inventor of My Pillow, between late 2019 and the summer of 2020. Both Krakowski and Lindell denied the allegation, and Lindell sued the Daily Mail for libel. The case was dismissed on the grounds that a "reasonable person" would not view anything in the Daily Mail article as defamatory.

In November 2021, Krakowski contracted a breakthrough case of COVID-19 and was forced to withdraw from NBC's Annie Live! where she was to play Lily St. Regis.

Filmography

Film performances

Television performances

Music video performances

Stage performances

Discography
Krakowski released her debut solo album on July 15, 2010. It is an album of cover versions called Laziest Gal in Town. It released on DRG Records.

Selected recordings include:
 1992: Grand Hotel, Studio Cast Recording (mostly original Broadway cast)
 1995: Company, Broadway revival cast recording
 1997: Once Upon a Mattress, Broadway revival cast recording
 1997: Sondheim at the Movies (singing the Academy Award-winning song "Sooner or Later" from Dick Tracy)
 1998: The Burt Bacharach Album
 2002: A Broadway Valentine
 2003: Nine, Broadway revival cast recording
 2004: A Christmas Carol, television cast recording
 2010: The Laziest Gal in Town, solo album
 2016: She Loves Me, Broadway revival cast recording

Awards and nominations

Film and television

Theater

References

External links

 
 
 
 

1968 births
20th-century American actresses
20th-century American singers
20th-century American women singers
21st-century American actresses
21st-century American singers
21st-century American women singers
Actresses from New Jersey
American child actresses
American film actresses
American game show hosts
American musical theatre actresses
American people of French-Canadian descent
American people of Polish descent
American people of Scottish descent
American soap opera actresses
American stage actresses
American television actresses
American voice actresses
Drama Desk Award winners
Laurence Olivier Award winners
Living people
Parsippany High School alumni
People from Parsippany-Troy Hills, New Jersey
Rutgers University alumni
Singers from New Jersey
Tony Award winners